Breakdown is a 1997 American thriller film directed and co-written by Jonathan Mostow. It stars Kurt Russell, J. T. Walsh and Kathleen Quinlan. The original music score was composed by Basil Poledouris. The film was produced by Dino De Laurentiis and Martha De Laurentiis, and released on May 2, 1997 by Paramount Pictures. It is the final film featuring Walsh to be released in his lifetime.

Plot 

Jeff Taylor and his wife Amy drive cross-country from Boston to San Diego in their new Jeep Grand Cherokee. They narrowly avoid colliding with a beat-up pickup truck. At a gas station, Earl, the driver of the truck, confronts Jeff and they exchange hostile words. Shortly after the couple resume their trip, their car breaks down on a vacant road. Leaving Jeff with the Jeep, Amy accepts a ride from a passing trailer truck driver to get to a nearby diner and call for help. Jeff eventually discovers that someone has tampered with the Jeep's battery connections. After reconnecting them, he drives to the diner, only to discover that no one has seen Amy. Jeff sees the trucker on the road and forces him to stop, but the trucker claims he has never seen Jeff or Amy. Jeff then hails a passing sheriff named Boyd, but a brief search of the truck yields no sign of Amy. The trucker, Red Barr, is allowed to leave and Boyd tells Jeff to see the deputy in the town of Brackett.

After speaking with the deputy, Jeff goes back to the diner. Billy, a mentally-impaired mechanic, informs Jeff that Amy left with some men, but refuses to speak with the police, claiming they are involved. Jeff rushes to the location Billy mentioned, but is ambushed on a back road by Earl. He escapes by driving his Jeep into a river and swimming away. Jeff circles back to watch Earl and another accomplice, Al, pull his Jeep out of the water. He is then discovered and knocked out by Billy.

When Jeff awakens, he is confronted by Billy (who feigned mental impairment earlier) and Earl. Their leader is Red Barr, who informs Jeff that he wants the $90,000 in Jeff's bank account in exchange for Amy's life, ordering him to withdraw the money in the nearby town of Brackett. Realizing he only has $5,000, Jeff attempts to alert the bank manager of his situation. However, paranoid that Red's group is watching him, Jeff abandons the idea and steals marked money ribbons and a letter opener. He uses the money ribbons to pack stacks of $1 bills between two $100 bills.

Jeff is then instructed to leave town, where Earl picks him up and binds him with duct tape. Earl begins gloating about how Jeff and his wife were easy targets, how he tampered with their Jeep, and that his group intends to kill them anyway. Jeff frees himself with the letter opener and stabs Earl. Jeff takes over the vehicle, binds Earl, and tortures him to reveal his rendezvous with Red at a local truck stop. They pass Boyd, who sees the speeding, swerving pickup and stops the vehicle. When Jeff exits the truck with Earl's gun, Boyd mistakes the situation and forces him to lie down. Earl frees himself and shoots Boyd with a concealed gun. Before Earl can shoot Jeff, a wounded Boyd shoots and kills him. Jeff uses Boyd's radio to call for an ambulance and rushes to the truck stop.

At the stop, Jeff stows away under the trailer of Red's truck. Early the next morning, Red arrives at his farm. Jeff sneaks into the barn, discovering evidence that Red has a history of robbing and killing people and that his real name is Warren. Al and Billy arrive with a bound and gagged Amy, whom they lock in a freezer in the barn's cellar. Unable to open the cellar door, Jeff finds a gun and demands the cellar key from Red. When he is distracted by Red's young son Deke, Billy escapes. Jeff forces Red to release Amy, exposing him in the process, and then locks him and his family in the cellar.

Jeff and Amy steal a pickup truck and flee, while Billy returns to free his accomplices, who each pursue the Taylors in their own vehicles. During the pursuit, Billy is killed in an explosion when Jeff forces his car off the road. Shortly after, the trailer from Red's truck detaches, causing Al to fatally crash into it. Undeterred, Red attempts to push Jeff and Amy's vehicle off a bridge with his truck, trapping Amy's leg underneath the dashboard. Jeff rushes out of the vehicle and into Red's tractor unit, where a struggle over the steering wheel forces Red's truck over the edge, leaving it dangling on a steel bridge support. Red attacks Jeff with a chain, until Jeff abruptly catches the chain and hurls Red to the rocks below. Jeff frees Amy from the dashboard. Seeing that Red survived the fall, Amy pulls the automatic shifter on their pickup truck, causing the suspended tractor unit to fall and crush him. Sitting on the edge of the bridge, Jeff and Amy embrace each other, waiting for the police to arrive.

Cast

 Kurt Russell as Jeff Taylor
 J. T. Walsh as Warren 'Red' Barr
 Kathleen Quinlan as Amy Taylor
 M. C. Gainey as Earl
 Jack Noseworthy as Billy
 Ritch Brinkley as Al
 Moira Harris as Arleen Barr
 Rex Linn as Sheriff Boyd
 Kim Robillard as Deputy Sheriff Len Carver
 Jack McGee as Bartender
 Vincent Berry as Deke Barr
  Steve Waddington as Cowboy In Bank
 Thomas Kopache as Calhoun

Production

Filming
Breakdown was filmed on location in Sacramento, California; Victorville, California; Pyramid Lake; Moab, Utah; Sedona, Arizona; and the Tasmanian Midlands Highway.

Music
The score was written by Basil Poledouris, with contributions from Steve Forman, Judd Miller, Eric Colvin and Richard Marvin.

It was released as a limited edition of 3,000 units by LaLaLand Records in June 2011. The release comprises a 3-CD set: the first CD contains the score as heard in the film, which contains material from additional composers. This is not 100% complete, omitting a few extremely low-key passages from the early scenes, nor is it chronological – some cues have been combined and re-ordered to maintain a listening experience.

The second CD contains an alternative early version of many cues by Poledouris that represent a different, far more orchestral approach to scoring the film (the score in the film stripped away many layers, and left mostly percussive and sound design elements for many cues.)

The third CD contains further alternates that demonstrate the changing nature of the music as scenes were re-scored.

Release
Breakdown was released in the United States on May 2, 1997.

Home media
The film was first released on Blu-ray disc in Australia by Imprint on February 24, 2021. It is scheduled to be released by Paramount Pictures on 4K remastered Blu-ray on the “Paramount Presents” line in the United States on September 21, 2021 with new extra features including audio commentary by director Jonathan Mostow and Kurt Russell, an isolated score and an alternate opening of the film.

Reception

Box office
Breakdown debuted at first place at the box office with $12.3 million. After initially opening to 2,108 theaters, the film later expanded to 2,348 theaters and grossed a total of $50,159,144 in the United States and Canada.

Critical response
The review aggregator website Rotten Tomatoes reported that 83% of critics gave the film positive reviews based upon a sample of 58, with an average score of 7.2/10. The site's consensus describes it as "A brainy and suspenseful – if somewhat uneven – thriller".  At Metacritic, which assigns a weighted average rating out of 100 to reviews from mainstream critics, the film received an average score of 73 based on 19 reviews.

David Harkin at Taste of Cinema points out that "Kurt Russell turns into his own version of John McClane but in cool shades and dusty chinos."

Peter Stack of the San Francisco Chronicle praised the film, "Breakdown use[s] old-fashioned ingenuity – plus a compelling star, a fast-paced mystery and a deadpan villain – to come up with a sizzler." Roger Ebert gave the film a positive review, calling it "taut, skillful and surgically effective". Stephen Hunter of The Washington Post criticized Russell for not conveying a desperate husband willing to fight for his missing wife, writing "He does a lot of running around while making desperate faces, but he never projects a sense of deep rage. He never gets dangerous. Thus the movie is shorn of its one primitive gratification: the image of the civilized man who finds the Peruvian commando inside himself and lays waste to louts who have underestimated him."

References

External links
 
 
 
 
 

1997 films
1997 crime thriller films
1990s American films
1990s English-language films
1990s mystery thriller films
1990s road movies
20th Century Fox films
American crime thriller films
American mystery thriller films
American road movies
Films about families
Films about kidnapping
Films about missing people
Films directed by Jonathan Mostow
Films produced by Dino De Laurentiis
Films produced by Martha De Laurentiis
Films scored by Basil Poledouris
Films set in the United States
Films shot in Arizona
Films shot in California
Films shot in Utah
Paramount Pictures films
Spelling Films films
Trucker films